Pakyong district is a district in the Indian state of Sikkim, administered from Pakyong. The district was formed in 2021 from three former subdivisions of the East Sikkim district, viz., Pakyong Subdivision, Rangpo Subdivision and Rongli Subdivision.  The remaining Gangtok Subdivision of the former district was named as the Gangtok district, which now bounds the Pakyong district in the northwest. In addition, the district is now bounded by the Kalimpong district of West Bengal, Bhutan,  and the Namchi district of Sikkim.

Demographics

Transport

Roadways
The major highways in Pakyong District are as follows:
 National Highway 10 connecting Siliguri to Gangtok, lies in Pakyong District from Rangpo to Singtam via Majitar.
 National Highway-717A connecting Bagrakote to Gangtok, lies in the Pakyong District from Reshi, Rhenock to Setipool near Ranipool via Rorathang and Pakyong.
 National Highway-717B connecting Rhenock and Menla, Sherathang via Zuluk and Rongli  lies mostly in Pakyong District.
 Atal Setu Bridge, the longest roadway bridge of sikkim connecting Pakyong District with Kalimpong district of West Bengal lies in Pakyong District.

Railway
The under construction Rangpo railway station lies in Pakyong District at the town of Rangpo.

Airways
Pakyong Greenfield Airport the only airport of Sikkim, lies on Pakyong District at the district Headquarter-Pakyong.

Assembly Constituencies
Assembly Constituencies falling under Pakyong District are as follows:
 Rhenock (Vidhan Sabha constituency)
 Chujachen (Vidhan Sabha constituency)
 West Pendam (Vidhan Sabha constituency)
 Gnathang-Machong (Vidhan Sabha constituency) and
 Namchaybong (Vidhan Sabha constituency)

Important Towns and Cities
The major towns and cities of Pakyong District are 
Pakyong
Rangpo
Rorathang
Rhenock
Rongli 
Majitar
Kumrek

Wildlife Sanctuaries
Pangolakha Wildlife Sanctuary lies in the Pakyong District. It is connected to Neora Valley National Park of Kalimpong district of North Bengal via thick forest cover in Aritar Rachela region.

Flora and fauna
Variety of plants and wildlife are found in Pakyong District. The important ones are red panda the state animal, blood pheasant the state bird Dendrobium nobile the state flower and Rhododendron the state tree are found in the wildlife sanctuaries of Pakyong District. Other important wild animals include Snow Leopard, Himalayan black bear, Clouded leopard, Large Indian civet etc.
Forest Department, Government of Sikkim has also confirmed the presence of Royal Bengal Tiger in the Pangolakha Wildlife Sanctuary of Pakyong District in January 2019.

Rivers
River Teesta, the largest river of state flows in Pakyong district from Singtam to Rangpo.

Rangpo River the third largest river of Sikkim originates from Lake Menmecho at Rongli Subdivision of Pakyong District and flows through Pakyong Subdivision and Rongli Subdivision villages and towns of Pakyong District before meeting river Teesta at Rangpo Town.

River Jaldhaka which originates near Dzuluk in Pakyong District and flows towards Bhutan, West Bengal and Bangladesh.

Other major rivers of Pakyong District are Richu Khola, Rongli Khola, Pachey Khola, Reshi Khola etc.

Sports
Mining Cricket Stadium located at Rangpo, Pakyong district is the largest cricket stadium of entire Sikkim. The stadium belongs to Sikkim Cricket Association and hosts important cricket tournaments like Ranji Trophy, CK Nayudu Trophy, Cooch Behar Trophy, Vijay Merchant Trophy etc.It is the home ground of Sikkim cricket team. Other major sports grounds of Pakyong district are St. Xavier's Football ground - Pakyong, Rongli Mela Ground, Rhenock SSS Ground, Chujachen SSS Ground, Central Pendam SSS Ground etc.

Education
Pakyong District has many educational institutions. Some important ones among them are as follows:
 Sikkim Manipal Institute of Technology, Majitar.
 Pakim Palatine College, Pakyong.
 Government Degree College, Rhenock.
 Advance Technical Training Centre, Bardang.
 Himalayan Pharmacy Institute, Majitar.
 Government Industrial Training Institute, Mining.
 National Institute of Electronics & Information Technology, Pacheykhani.
 Eklavya Model Residential School, Thekabong.
 Jawahar Navodaya Vidyalaya, Pakyong

Achievements
Pakyong District of Sikkim achieved the 𝟖𝐭𝐡 𝐫𝐚𝐧𝐤 𝐚𝐦𝐨𝐧𝐠𝐬𝐭 𝟕𝟓 𝐝𝐢𝐬𝐭𝐫𝐢𝐜𝐭𝐬 𝐨𝐟 𝐈𝐧𝐝𝐢𝐚 which were selected for 𝐭𝐡𝐞 𝐀𝐳𝐚𝐝𝐢 𝐒𝐞 𝐀𝐧𝐭𝐲𝐨𝐝𝐚𝐲𝐚 𝟗𝟎 𝐝𝐚𝐲𝐬 𝐜𝐚𝐦𝐩𝐚𝐢𝐠𝐧.

Pakyong Police Station of Pakyong in Pakyong District of Sikkim is ranked seventh among the top ten best performing police stations in the country according to a survey conducted by the Ministry of Home Affairs, Government of India in 2020.
  Vivanta Sikkim, a Five Star hotel of Pakyong district wins HICSA best hotel of the year award.
Jetsen Dona Lama, 9 year old girl from Pakyong, Sikkim won singing reality show 'Sa Re Ga Ma Pa Little Champs' aired on Zee TV on 22nd January 2022.

References

Districts of Sikkim